John DeCaro (born November 9, 1982) is an American retired professional ice hockey goaltender who played for the Sheffield Steelers of the Elite Ice Hockey League. In the 2013–2014 season, DeCaro retired from professional ice hockey.

External links

1982 births
Living people
American men's ice hockey goaltenders
Alaska Aces (ECHL) players
Bossier-Shreveport Mudbugs players
Ice hockey people from Washington (state)
Las Vegas Wranglers players
Philadelphia Phantoms players
Portland Pirates players
Sheffield Steelers players
People from Marysville, Washington